Harry Hansen (20 September 1894 – 1 November 1946) was a Danish footballer. He played in five matches for the Denmark national football team from 1916 to 1922.

References

External links
 

1894 births
1946 deaths
Danish men's footballers
Denmark international footballers
Place of birth missing
Association footballers not categorized by position